Kabita ( – 8 June 2012) was a Bangladeshi film actress who starred in films like Dhanyee Meye, Molua, Kanchanmala and Coolie.

Career
Kabita was born in Karachi, Dominion of Pakistan in 1952. Her family moved to Bangladesh after 1971. She made her film debut in 1967 as a child artist in Kanchanmala. Later, she got her breakthrough in 1969 with Nil Akasher Niche where she played a supporting role alongside Kabori Sarwar. Dhanyee Meye is considered her most applauded film. She left Dhallywood after marriage in 1975. She divorced her husband in 1982 and made a comeback. She died on 8 June 2012 in Dhaka.

Filmography

References 

1952 births
2012 deaths
Actresses in Bengali cinema
Bangladeshi film actresses
Actresses from Karachi
Pakistani emigrants to Bangladesh